Jaipur School is a K-12 private school in Jaipur, Rajasthan, India, which was registered in 1980 in Rajasthan, India. The school provides secular education as per the curriculum of the Central Board of Secondary Education (CBSE), and provides spiritual education under the auspices of organizations such as the International Society for Krishna Consciousness (ISKCON), Ramakrishna Mission and Chinmaya Mission.

The school is headed by Major N.K. Sharma (retired) as the director.

History
Founded in 1979 by the Jaipur School Association, a non-profit group to promote education among all classes of people in English, Hindi and other languages.

The founder is Major N.K. Sharma (retired), alumnus of India's elite military school Rashtriya Indian Military College and India's foremost military colleges, National Defence Academy and Indian Military Academy. 
 
"Jaipur School" is a co-ed English medium school, from class creche to
12 . It is affiliated with the CBSE. It continues to have
permanent recognition from the Department of Education, Government
of Rajasthan.
The school has produced merit rankers of the State Board exams and
merit scholars of the CBSE. Students have gone on to join the Harvard
University, the University of Chicago, the Cardiff University, the
Indian Institutes of Technology, the National Defence Academy, the
AIIMS, and other engineering, medical, chartered accountants, liberal
arts and business management programs

Description
The school has facilities for sports including gymnastics, volleyball, baseball, judo-karate, athletics and for extra-curricular activities including drama, dance, elocution, creative writing and science exhibitions. Learning English is compulsory for students.

Location
Sector 6, Vidya Dhar Nagar, Jaipur, Rajasthan.

References
Directory of affiliated schools of C.B.S.E. (Central Board of Secondary Education), 2007.
List of recognized schools (2007), Department of Education, Government of Rajasthan, India

External links
Department of Education, Government of Rajasthan
Jaipur Development Authority
List of C.B.S.E. affiliated schools

Educational institutions established in 1979
Schools in Jaipur
1979 establishments in Rajasthan